The 2013–14 Barako Bull Energy was the 12th season of the franchise in the Philippine Basketball Association (PBA).

Key dates
October 30: Rajko Toroman was relieved as active consultant and assistant coach of the team.
November 3: The 2013 PBA Draft took place in Midtown Atrium, Robinson Place Manila.
April 21: Bong Ramos is replaced by Siot Tanquincen as head coach.

Draft picks

Roster
S

Philippine Cup

Eliminations

Standings

Commissioner's Cup

Eliminations

Standings

Governors' Cup

Eliminations

Standings

Bracket

Transactions

Trades

Pre-season

Recruited imports

References

Barako Bull Energy seasons
Barako Bull